The Beaconsfield is an apartment building located on Main Street at Pease Street in Downtown Houston.  The building is listed on the National Register of Historic Places.

The Beaconsfield was designed as an apartment building by local architect Alonzo C. Pigg. Lamb-Field Company started construction in December 1910 and completed the building in 1911.  The eight-story building housed just sixteen apartments, each with "two screened balconies and six large rooms with fireplaces." Building amenities included servants quarters, elevators, back stairways, and parking.

See also
 National Register of Historic Places listings in Harris County, Texas

References

Buildings and structures completed in 1911
National Register of Historic Places in Houston
1911 establishments in Texas
Buildings and structures in Houston
Residential buildings on the National Register of Historic Places in Texas